Vanderwulpia sororcula is a species of bristle fly in the family Tachinidae. It is diurnal

Distribution
Mexico.

References

Tachininae
Insects described in 1975
Diptera of North America